A war artist is an artist either commissioned by a government or publication, or self-motivated, to document first-hand experience of war in any form of illustrative or depictive record. War artists explore the visual and sensory dimensions of war, often absent in written histories or other accounts of warfare.

These artists may be involved in war as onlookers to the scenes, military personnel, or as specifically commissioned to be present and record military activity.

Artists record military activities in ways that cameras and the written word cannot. Their art collects and distills the experiences of the people who endured it. The artists and their artwork affect how subsequent generations view military conflicts. For example, Australian war artists who grew up between the two world wars were influenced by the artwork which depicted the First World War, and there was a precedent and format for them to follow.

Official war artists have been appointed by governments for information or propaganda purposes and to record events on the battlefield, but there are many other types of war artists. These can include combatants who are artists and choose to record their experiences, non-combatants who are witnesses of war, and prisoners of war who may voluntarily record the conditions or be appointed war artists by senior officers.

In New Zealand, the title of appointed "war artist" is "army artist". In the United States, the term "combat artist" has come to be used to mean the same thing.

Some examples and their background 
 William Simpson was an artist-correspondent who sent artwork to London from the front during the Crimean War. 
 Alfred Waud was an American civil war pictorial newspaper illustrator. 
 Ogata Gekkō and Tsuguharu Foujita created woodblock prints for Japanese publications. 
 Ronald Searle recorded life in Japanese POW camps. 
 Emmanuel Leutze's 1851 studio painting of Washington Crossing the Delaware is historically incorrect, and Leutze was born decades after the event his painting depicts, but this work has become an icon of popular culture.

War artists by nationality

Argentine
Cándido López (1840–1902), Paraguayan War

Australian

War artists have depicted all the conflicts in which Australians have been called to combat. The Australian tradition of "official war artists" started with the First World War. Artists were granted permission to accompany the Australian Imperial Force to record the activities of its soldiers. During the Second World War, the Australian War Museum, later called the Australian War Memorial, engaged artists. At the same time, the Royal Australian Navy, Australian Army, and Royal Australian Air Force appointed official war artist-soldiers from within their ranks. These embedded war artists have depicted the activities of Australian forces in Korea, Vietnam, East Timor, Afghanistan, and Iraq.

The ranks of non-soldier artists like George Gittoes continue to create artwork which becomes a commentary on Australia's military actions in war.

Selected artists
A select list of representative Australian artists includes:

Austrian

 Alfred Basel
 Roman Zenzinger

British

British participation in foreign wars has been the subject of paintings and other works created by Britain's war artists. Artwork like the 1688 painting,The Fleet at Sea by Willem van de Velde the Younger depict the Royal Navy in readiness for battle. The Ministry of Defence  art collection includes many paintings showing battle scenes, particularly naval battles. Military art and portraiture has evolved along with other aspects of war. The British official war artists of the First World War created a unique account of that conflict. The British War Artists Scheme expanded the number of official artists and enlarged the scope of their activities during the Second War.

Significant themes in the chronicle of twentieth-century wars have been developed by non-military, non-official, civilian artists. For example, society portraitist Arabella Dorman's paintings of wounded Iraq War veterans inspired her to spend two weeks with three regiments in different frontline areas: the Green Jackets at Basra Palace, the Queen's Own Gurkhas at Shaibah Logistics Base ten miles south-west of Basra, and the Queen's Royal Lancers in the Maysaan desert. In the field, Dorman drew quick charcoal portraits of the men she met. Returning to England, the sketches she made helped her use art to "evoke the emotions and psychological impact of war," rather than depicting the "physical horror" of war.

Selected artists
A select list of representative British artists includes:

Belgian

First World War
 Alfred Bastien, 1873—1955

Canadian

Representative works by Canada's artists whose work illustrates and records war are gathered into the extensive collection of the Canadian War Museum. The earliest war art in Canada was rock art created by Indigenous peoples from all regions of the country. During the colonial period, large-scale, European-style paintings of war dominated New France and British North America. The First and Second World Wars saw a dramatic increase in the production of war art in every medium. A few First World War paintings were exhibited in the Senate of Canada Chamber, and artists studied these works as a way of preparing to create new artworks in the conflict in Europe which expanded after 1939.

In the Second World War, Canada expanded its official art program; Canadian war artists were a kind of journalist who lived the lives of soldiers. The work of non-official civilian artists also became part of the record of this period. Canada supported Canadian official war artists in both the First World War and the Second World War; no official artists were designated during the Korean War.

Among Canada's embedded artist-journalist teams was Richard Johnson, who was sent by the National Post to Afghanistan in 2007 and 2011; his drawings of Canadian troops were published and posted online as part of the series "Kandahar Journal".

Prominent themes explored by Canadian war artists include commemoration, identity, women, Indigenous representation, propaganda, protest, violence, and religion.

Selected artists
A select list of representative Canadian artists includes:

First World War
 John William Beatty, 1869–1941
 Alexander Young Jackson CC CMG, 1882–1974
 Arthur Lismer CC, 1885–1969 
 Frederick Varley, 1881–1969
 Mabel May, 1877-1971
Marion Long, 1882–1970

Second World War
 Eric Aldwinckle, 1909-1980
 Donald Kenneth Anderson, 1920–2009
 Harold Beament, 1898-1985 
 Alan Brockman Beddoe OC OBE HFHS FHSC, 1893–1975
 Molly Lamb Bobak CM ONB, 1922–2014   
 Paraskeva Clark
 David Alexander Colville PC CC ONS, 1920–2013
 Charles Fraser Comfort OC, 1900–1994
 Charles Goldhamer, 1903–1985
 Paul Goranson, 1911–2002
 Lawren P. Harris, 1910-1994
 William Abernethy Ogilvie CM MBE, 1901–1989
 George Campbell Tinning RCA, 1910-1996
 Jack Shadbolt OC OBC, 1909–1998

Recent conflicts
 Richard Johnson, b. 1966
Edward Zuber, b. 1932

Chilean
 Nicolás Guzmán Bustamante (1850–1928), chiefly painting the War of the Pacific and the Conquest of Chile

Chinese
 Li Hua
 Feng Zikai

Dutch

 Willem van de Velde the Elder
 Philips Wouwerman

Finnish

World War II
 Kari Suomalainen (1920-1999), Finland's most famous editorial cartoonist, worked as a war artist during World War II.

Flemish
 Vincent Adriaenssen
 Pieter van Bloemen
 Frans Breydel
 Karel Breydel
 Jasper Broers
 Laureys a Castro
 Nicolaas van Eyck
 Frans Geffels
 Robert van den Hoecke
 Lambert de Hondt the Elder
 Jan Baptist van der Meiren
 Adam Frans van der Meulen
 Pieter Meulener
 Arnold Frans Rubens
 Lucas Smout the Younger
 Peter Snayers
 Jan Snellinck
 Jan Peeter Verdussen
 Pieter Verdussen
 Sebastiaen Vrancx
 Cornelis de Wael

French

During the First World War, the work of artists depicting aspects of the military conflict were put on display in official war art exhibitions. In 1916 the Ministry of Beaux-Arts and the Ministry of War sponsored the Salon des Armées to show the work of the artists who had been mobilized. This one exhibition realized 60,000 francs. The proceeds supported needy artists at home and the disabled.
 Hippolyte Bellangé
 Nicolas Toussaint Charlet
 Eugène Chigot
 Edouard Detaille
 Antoine-Jean Gros
 Constantin Guys
 Eugène Louis Lami
 Louis-François, Baron Lejeune
 Jean-Louis-Ernest Meissonier
 Alphonse-Marie de Neuville
 Paul Philippoteaux
 Paul Alexandre Protais
 Denis Auguste Marie Raffet
 Carle Vernet
 Horace Vernet
 Antoine Watteau
Adolphe Yvon

German

 Emmanuel Leutze
 Adolph Menzel

Franco-Prussian War
 Georg Bleibtreu
 Wilhelm Camphausen
 Emil Hünten
 Carl Röchling
 Anton von Werner

First World War
 Luitpold Adam
 Otto Dix
 Theodor Rocholl

Second World War
Luitpold Adam
Heinrich Amersdorffer
 Alfred Hierl
 Conrad Hommel
 Hans Liska

Recent conflicts
 Frauke Eigen, b. 1969

Japanese

 Kubota Beisen, 1852–1906
 Toyohara Chikanobu, 1838–1912
 Tsuguharu Foujita, 1886–1968
 Ogata Gekkō, 1859–1920
 Toshihide Migita, 1862–1925
 Utagawa Yoshiiku, 1833–1904

Korean
 Kim Seong-hwan, 1932–

New Zealand

War artists have been appointed by the government to supplement the record of New Zealand's military history. The title of "war artist" changed to "army artist" when Ion Brown was appointed after the two world wars.

Conservators at the National Art Gallery considered the collection to be of historic rather than artistic worth; few were displayed. New Zealand's National Collection of War Art encompasses the work of artists who were working on commission for the Government as official war artists, while others created artworks for their own reasons.

Selected artists
A select list of representative New Zealand artists includes:

First World War

 George Edmund Butler
 Nugent Herman

Second World War
 James Boswell, 1906–1971
 Russell Clark, 1905–1966 
 John McIndoe, 1898–1995;
 Peter McIntyre OBE, 1910–1995<ref>{{cite web|url= |title=Peter McIntyre's war art online |publisher=Warart.archives.govt.nz |access-date=2012-07-15}}</ref>

Recent conflicts
 Graham Braddock
 Ion Brown, Bosnia and Croatia
 Matthew Gauldie, Solomon Islands and Afghanistan

Russian

 Mikhail Avilov 
 Nikolai Baskakov
 Lev Chegorovsky
 Vladimir Chekalov
 Aleksandr Deyneka
 Nikolai Dmitriev-Orenburgsky
 Rudolf Frentz
 Nikolay Karazin
 Aleksey Kivshenko
 Victor Korovin
 Alexander Kotzebue
 Lev Lagorio
 Viktor Poltavets
 Franz Roubaud
 Nikolai Samokish
 Alexander Sauerweid
 Nikolay Sauerweid
 Vasily Vereshchagin
 Bogdan Willewalde

Serbian
 Mihailo Milovanović (1879-1941), one of the most distinguished artists in World War I
 Veljko Stanojević (1892-1967)
 Kosta Miličević (1877-1920)
 Živorad Nastasijević (1895-1966)
 Nadežda Petrović succumbed to typhus fever in 1915
 Natalija Cvetković (1888-1928)
 Beta Vukanović survived as a widow and lived to be 100.
 Rista Vukanović is the husband of Beta Vukanović. He died in 1918
 Miodrag Petrović (1888-1950)
 Todor Švrakić
 Vladimir Becić who early in his career joined the Serbian Army
 Ana Marinković (1881-1973)

South African
 Neville Lewis (World War II)

Spanish

Francisco de Goya, e.g., The Disasters of War, The Third of May 1808, 1810s
 Pablo Picasso, Guernica, 1937.
 Augusto Ferrer-Dalmau 1964

United States

The American panorama created by artists whose work focuses on war began with a visual account of the American Revolutionary War. The war artist or combat artist captures instantaneous action and conflates earlier moments of the same scene within one compelling image. Artists are unlike the objective camera lens, which records only a single instant and no more.

In 1917 the American military designated American official war artists who were sent to Europe to record the activities of the American Expeditionary Forces.

In World War II, the Navy Combat Art Program ensured that active-duty artists developed a record of all phases of the war and all major naval operations.

The official war artist continued to be supported in some military engagements. Teams of soldier-artists during the Vietnam War created pictorial accounts and interpretations for the annals of army military history. In 1992 the Army Staff Artist Program was attached to the United States Army Center of Military History as a permanent part of the Museum Division's Collections Branch.

The majority of combat artists of the 1970s were selected by George Gray, chairman of NACAL, Navy Air Cooperation and Liaison committee. Some of their paintings will be selected for the Navy Combat Art Museum in the capital by Charles Lawrence, director.  In January 1978 the U.S. Navy chose a seascape specialist team: they asked Patricia Yaps and Wayne Dean, both of Milford, Connecticut, to capture air-sea rescue missions off of Key West while they were based at the nearby Naval Air Station Key West. They were among 78 artists selected that year to create works of art depicting Navy subjects.Andree Hickok, 2 Combat artists capture life and death on canvas, The Sunday Post Closeup F-1, July 2, 1978

Selected artists
A select list of representative American artists includes:

Vietnam era
Soldier Artist Participants in the U. S. Army Vietnam Combat Artists Program

 CAT I, 15 Aug – 15 Dec 1966, Roger A. Blum (Stillwell, KS), Robert C. Knight (Newark, NJ), Ronald E. Pepin (East Hartford, CT), Paul Rickert (Philadelphia, PA), Felix R. Sanchez (Fort Madison, IA), John O. Wehrle (Dallas, TX), and supervisor, Frank M. Sherman
 CAT II, 15 Oct 1966 – 15 Feb 1967, Augustine G. Acuna (Monterey, CA), Alexander A. Bogdanovich (Chicago, IL), Theodore E. Drendel (Naperville, IL), David M. Lavender (Houston, TX), Gary W. Porter (El Cajon, CA), and supervisor, Carolyn M. O'Brien
 CAT III, 16 Feb – 17 June 1967, Michael R. Crook (Sierra Madre, CA), Dennis O. McGee (Castro Valley, CA), Robert T. Myers (White Sands Missile Range, NM), Kenneth J. Scowcroft (Manassas, VA), Stephen H. Sheldon (Los Angeles, CA), and supervisor, C. Bruce Smyser
 CAT IV, 15 Aug – 31 Dec 1967, Samuel E. Alexander (Philadelphia, MS), Daniel T. Lopez (Fresno, CA), Burdell Moody (Mesa, AZ), James R. Pollock (Pollock, SD), Ronald A. Wilson (Alhambra, CA), and technical supervisor, Frank M. Thomas
 CAT V, 1 Nov 1967 – 15 March 1968, Warren W. Buchanan (Kansas City, MO), Philip V. Garner (Dearborn, MI), Phillip W. Jones (Greensboro, NC), Don R. Schol (Denton, TX), John R. Strong (Kanehoe, HI), and technical supervisor, Frank M. Thomas
 CAT VI, 1 Feb – 15 June 1968, Robert T. Coleman (Grand Rapids, MI), David N. Fairrington (Oakland, CA), John D. Kurtz IV (Wilmington, DE), Kenneth T. McDaniel (Paris, TN), Michael P. Pala (Bridgeport, CT)
 CAT VII, 15 Aug – 31 Dec 1968, Brian H. Clark (Huntington, NY), William E. Flaherty Jr. (Louisville, KY), William C. Harrington (Terre Haute, IN), Barry W. Johnston (Huntsville, AL), Stephen H. Randall (Des Moines, IA), and supervisor, Fitzallen N. Yow
 CAT VIII, 1 Feb – 15 June 1969, Edward J. Bowen (Carona Del Mar, CA), James R. Drake (Colorado Springs, CO), Roman Rakowsky (Cleveland, OH), Victory V. Reynolds (Idaho Falls, ID), Thomas B. Schubert (Chicago, IL), and supervisor, Fred B. Engel
 CAT IX, 1 Sept 1969 – 14 Jan 1970, David E. Graves (Lawrence, KS), James S. Hardy (Coronado, CA), William R. Hoettels (San Antonio, TX), Bruce N. Rigby (Dekalb, IL), Craig L. Stewart (Laurel, MD), and supervisor, Edward C. Williams

Recent conflicts
 Kristopher Battles, Iraq and Afghanistan
 Henry Casselli
 Michael D. Fay, Iraq and Afghanistan
 Victor Juhasz, Afghanistan

See also
 War photography
 Commission (art)
 American official war artists
 Australian official war artists
 British official war artists
 Canadian official war artists
 German official war artists
 Japanese official war artists
 New Zealand official war artists

Notes

References

 McCloskey, Barbara. (2005). Artists of World War II. Westport: Greenwood Press. ; OCLC 475496457
 Nussbaum, Louis Frédéric and Käthe Roth. (2005). Japan Encyclopedia. Cambridge: Harvard University Press. ; OCLC 48943301
 Okamoto, Shumpei and Donald Keene. (1983). Impressions of the Front: Woodcuts of the Sino Japanese War, 1894–95. Philadelphia: Philadelphia Museum of Art. OCLC 179964815

Further reading

 Brandon, Laura. (2008). Art and War. New York: I.B. Tauris. ; OCLC 225345535
 Cork, Richard. (1994). A Bitter Truth: Avant-garde Art and the Great War. New Haven: Yale University Press. ; OCLC 185692286
 Foot, Michael Richard Daniel. (1990). Art and War: Twentieth Century Warfare as Depicted by War Artists. London: Headline. ; OCLC 21407670
 Gallatin, Albert Eugene. (1919). Art and the Great War. New York: E.P. Dutton. OCLC 422817
 Hodgson, Pat (1977). The War Illustrators. London: Osprey. OCLC 462210052
 Johnson, Peter (1978). Front-Line Artists. London: Cassell. ; OCLC 4412441
 Jones, James (1975). WW II: a Chronicle of Soldiering. New York: Grosset & Dunlap. 1617592
 Lanker, Brian and Nicole Newnham. (2000). They Drew Fire: Combat Artists of World War II. New York: TV Books. ; OCLC 43245885

Australia
 Reid, John B. (1977). Australian Artists at War: Compiled from the Australian War Memorial Collection. Volume 1. 1885–1925; Vol. 2 1940–1970. South Melbourne, Victoria: Sun Books. ; OCLC 4035199

Canada
 Oliver, Dean Frederick, and Laura Brandon (2000). Canvas of War: Painting the Canadian Experience, 1914 to 1945. Vancouver: Douglas & McIntyre. ; OCLC 43283109
 Tippett, Maria. (1984). Art at the Service of War: Canada, Art, and the Great War. Toronto: University of Toronto Press. ; OCLC 13858984

Germany
 Gilkey, Gordon. War Art of the Third Reich. Bennington, Vermont: International Graphics Corporation, 1982). ; OCLC 223704492
 Weber, John Paul. (1979). The German War Artists. Columbia, South Carolina: Cerberus. 	; OCLC 5727293

 New Zealand
 Haworth, Jennifer. (2007). The Art of War: New Zealand War Artists in the Field 1939–1945. Christchurch, New Zealand: Hazard Press. ; OCLC 174078159

South Africa
 Carter, Albert Charles Robinson. (1900). The Work of War Artists in South Africa. London: "The Art Journal" Office. OCLC 25938498

United Kingdom
 Gough, Paul. (2010). A Terrible Beauty: British Artists in the First World War. Bristol: Sansom and Company. ; OCLC 559763485
 Harries, Meirion and Suzie Harries. (1983). The War Artists: British Official War Art of the Twentieth Century. London: Michael Joseph. ; OCLC 9888782
 Harrington, Peter. (1983). British Artists and War: The Face of Battle in Paintings and Prints, 1700–1914. London: Greenhill. ; OCLC 28708501
 Haycock, David Boyd. (2009). A Crisis of Brilliance: Five Young British Artists and the Great War. London: Old Street Publishing. ; OCLC 318876179
 Hichberger, J.W.M. (1988). Images of the Army: The Military in British Art 1815–1914. Manchester: Manchester University Press. ; OCLC 17295891
 Sillars, Stuart (1987). Art and Survival in First World War Britain. New York: St. Martins Press. ; OCLC 14932245
Holme, Charles. (1918). The War Depicted by Distinguished British Artists. London: The Studio. OCLC 5081170

United States
 Cornebise, Alfred. (1991). Art from the trenches: America's Uniformed Artists in World War I. College Station: Texas A & M University Press. ; OCLC 22892632
 Harrington, Peter, and Frederic A. Sharf. (1988). A Splendid Little War; The Spanish–American War, 1898; The Artists' Perspective. London: Greenhill. ; OCLC 260112479
 Chase Maenius. The Art of War[s]: Paintings of Heroes, Horrors and History. 2014.

External links
Mémorial de Caen, 1914–1918 war, Artists of the First World War
Ministry of Defence (MoD), MoD art collection, war artists
National Archives (UK), The Art of War
In War-torn Country a Soldier Looks at Iraq by Lance Nixon, Capital Journal, Vol 134 No. 27, 7 February 2014 pp C1-C6
Harvey Dunn at War by Lance Nixon, Capital Journal, Vol 134 No. 32, 14 February 2014 pp C1-C6
Remembering Battles They Fought Facing East: Plains Indians as War Artists by Lance Nixon, Capital Journal, Vol 134 No. 57 pp C1-C6
About light and dark in peace and war and a piece of Vietnam by Lance Nixon, Capital Journal (South Dakota), 17 January 2014.
Drawing fire by Lance Nixon, Capital Journal  (South Dakota), 23 January 2014.
A photograph of a war is different from a painting “that’s not rocket science” by Dave Askins, Capital Journal  (South Dakota), 20 April 2018.
Combat artists share ware experiences by Kerri Lawrence, National Archives News, 9 April 2018 
National Archives Facebook Combat Art Panel 
US Army Soldier-Artists in Vietnam (CAT IV, 15 August to 31 December, 1967) by James Pollock, War, Literature & the Arts: An International Journal of the Humanities, free downloadable PDF South Dakota State University Open PRAIRIE repository/2009 Volume 21 
SDPB Radio Interview MIDDAY Karl Gehrke interviews James Pollock, 10 June 2015.

War art